The 1983–84 Northern Counties East Football League season was the second in the history of Northern Counties East Football League, a football competition in England.

Premier Division

The Premier Division featured 18 clubs which competed in the previous season, no new clubs joined the division this season.

League table

Division One North

Division One North featured 12 clubs which competed in the previous season, along with two new clubs, promoted from Division Two North:
Pontefract Collieries
Rowntree Mackintosh

League table

Division One South

Division One South featured 12 clubs which competed in the previous season, along with two new clubs, promoted from Division Two South:
Borrowash Victoria
Woolley Miners Welfare

League table

Division Two North

Division Two North featured 12 clubs which competed in the previous season, along with two new clubs:
Armthorpe Welfare, joined from Doncaster & District Senior League
Hall Road Rangers, relegated from Division One North

League table

Division Two South

Division Two South featured nine clubs which competed in the previous season, along with four new clubs:
Brigg Town, relegated from Division One South
Kimberley Town, relegated from Division One South
Retford Town, joined from the Derbyshire League
Yorkshire Main, joined from the Sheffield Association League

League table

References

1983-84
8